Chris Beck may refer to:
Chris Beck (baseball) (born 1990), American baseball player
Christophe Beck (born  1968), Canadian film and TV composer
Chris Beck (Navy SEAL) (born 1966), retired US Navy SEAL who came out as a trans woman and then detransitioned
Chris Beck, a character in The Martian (Weir novel)